José Edgar Andrade da Costa (born 14 April 1987) is a Portuguese professional footballer who plays for C.S. Marítimo as a forward or winger.

He played over 275 Primeira Liga games and scored 21 goals for Nacional and Marítimo, having started his career with a third team from Madeira, União.

Club career
Born in Câmara de Lobos, Madeira, Costa finished his development at local C.F. União. He made his senior debut with the club in 2006, and played three third-division seasons with it.

In the summer of 2009, Costa joined neighbouring C.D. Nacional, appearing in 14 games in his first season in the Primeira Liga (nine as a substitute) and scoring two goals as the team finished in seventh position. His debut in the competition came on 12 September 2009, playing 25 minutes in a 2–0 away loss against Rio Ave FC.

On 14 July 2011, Costa scored on his continental debut in the second qualifying round of the UEFA Europa League, opening a 1–1 draw away to Iceland's Fimleikafélag Hafnarfjarðar. In January 2012 he spent a week on trial at West Ham United, but nothing came of it. Released by Nacional in June of the following year, he signed for Moreirense F.C. of the Segunda Liga.

Costa subsequently spent several campaigns in the Portuguese top tier with C.S. Marítimo, where he was named captain before the start of 2016–17. He signed new contracts in November 2016 and June 2019.

On 12 January 2020, Costa played his 200th top-flight game in a goalless draw with Vitória de Guimarães. He agreed to further one-year extensions that August, and in the following May.

International career
Costa represented Portugal at under-19 level.

Personal life
Costa's younger sister, Érica (born 1995), played in the same position for Marítimo's women's team.

References

External links

1987 births
Living people
People from Câmara de Lobos
Portuguese footballers
Madeiran footballers
Association football wingers
Association football forwards
Primeira Liga players
Liga Portugal 2 players
Segunda Divisão players
C.F. União players
C.D. Nacional players
Moreirense F.C. players
C.S. Marítimo players
Portugal youth international footballers